The 2005 Tulsa Golden Hurricane football team represented the University of Tulsa in the 2005 NCAA Division I-A football season. The team's head coach was Steve Kragthorpe. They played home games at Skelly Stadium in Tulsa, Oklahoma and competed in the West Division of Conference USA.

Schedule

References

Tulsa
Tulsa Golden Hurricane football seasons
Conference USA football champion seasons
Liberty Bowl champion seasons
Tulsa Golden Hurricane football